Whiteside, Barnett and Co. Agricultural Works, also known as Canal-Front Warehouse, is a historic factory and warehouse complex located at Brockport in Monroe County, New York. It is a largely intact and rare surviving example of the brownstone industrial building that once lined the banks of the Erie Canal at Brockport.  It is also the only surviving building related to the local reaper manufacturing industry.  The existing buildings were built between 1850 and 1852 for the Agricultural Works in Brockport, later known as Whiteside, Barnett and Co.  The property was later used as a lumberyard from about 1880 to 1904 and as a cannery until 1945.

It was listed on the National Register of Historic Places in 2001.  In 2008, the property was purchased by a local development corporation called the Greater Brockport Development Corp (GBDC).  Red Hook, Brooklyn developer Greg O'Connell, who had recently revitalized the business district of Mount Morris, New York, expressed an interest in the property in early 2014, feeling that it could spark a similar revitalization in Brockport. However, the Town of Sweden rejected a tax break plan and O'Connell declined to purchase the property.

References

Brockport, New York
Industrial buildings and structures on the National Register of Historic Places in New York (state)
Industrial buildings completed in 1852
Buildings and structures in Monroe County, New York
1852 establishments in New York (state)
National Register of Historic Places in Monroe County, New York
Erie Canal
Agricultural machinery manufacturers of the United States